Max Veloso Alves, known as Max Veloso (born 27 March 1992) is a Swiss footballer who plays as a midfielder for Xamax.

Career 
Veloso began his career with Xamax and was on 4 June 2009 promoted to the Swiss Super League team. In his first senior year for Xamax he did not play a minute and was loaned out to Biel on 17 May 2010.

In May 2013 he made his debut in the first team of Sion, scoring his first goal on 2 June.

On 25 June 2021, he returned to Xamax on a one-year deal.

References

External links 

Switzerland U21 stats

1992 births
People from Vila Verde
Swiss people of Portuguese descent
Living people
Swiss men's footballers
Switzerland youth international footballers
Switzerland under-21 international footballers
Association football midfielders
Neuchâtel Xamax FCS players
FC Biel-Bienne players
FC Sion players
FC Vaduz players
FC Lausanne-Sport players
FC Sheriff Tiraspol players
Swiss Super League players
Swiss Challenge League players
Swiss Promotion League players
Moldovan Super Liga players
Swiss expatriate footballers
Expatriate footballers in Liechtenstein
Swiss expatriate sportspeople in Liechtenstein
Expatriate footballers in Moldova
Swiss expatriate sportspeople in Moldova